Miguel Cascales Maestre (born 5 November 1979)  is a Spanish-born Australian chef, restaurateur, author and television presenter, who has co-hosted the lifestyle television series The Living Room.

Maestre has presented TV programmes Miguel's Feast, Miguel's Tropical Kitchen and Boys Weekend. He participated in, and won the sixth season of I'm a Celebrity...Get Me Out of Here! on Sunday, 2 February 2020.

In October 2013, Maestre became an Australian citizen.

Career
At the age of 21, Maestre travelled to experience the world and moved to Scotland where he began cooking and learnt to speak English. Maestre worked at Indigo Yard, Montpelier's Partnership. Maestre then returned to Spain, before moving to Australia. He worked in some of Sydney's premier kitchens including Bather's Pavilion, Bel Mondo, Cru and Minus 5 at Circular Quay. At the age of 27, Maestre worked as Head Chef of Tony Bilson's Number One Wine Bar in Sydney's Circular Quay, where he was originally working under Manu Feildel. Following a meeting with Spanish chef Ferran Adrià at elBulli, Maestre opened Australia's biggest Spanish restaurant named El Toro Loco at Manly Beach.
Maestre was head chef at El Toro Loco until he departed in 2010 following a legal stoush and the restaurant's name was changed to El Poco Loco.

In May 2018, Barry Du Bois and Maestre  released an autobiographical book called Life Force about Du Bois's family, friendships, living with cancer and includes nutritional advice and recipes by Maestre.

In 2019, Maestre competed in the sixteenth season of Dancing with the Stars, where he was paired with Megan Wragg. He was first to be eliminated.

In 2020, Maestre won the sixth season of I'm A Celebrity...Get Me Out of Here! Australia.

Television

Books
 Spanish Cooking, Hardcover (2012): , 
 Life Force by Barry Du Bois and  Miguel Maestre, Paperback (2018) :

Awards
In 2014, Maestre was honoured by the King of Spain, Felipe VI, with the Cruz de Oficial de la Orden del Mérito Civil (Officer's Cross - Order of the Civil Merit) for his "outstanding profile and representation of Spain in the Australian media" which was presented to Maestre by the Spanish Ambassador to Australia, Enrique de Viguera, in Canberra.

Charity work
Maestre is an ambassador for Cancer Council Australia, CARE Australia and R U OK?  since 2014

Personal life

Maestre met his Australian partner Sascha while he was living and working at Indigo Yard in Edinburgh and where she was working as a waitress. They married in 2010 and have a daughter (born 2011) and a son (born 2014).
Maestre has a younger brother who is a restaurant manager.

References

External links
Miguel Maestre's Official website
Maestre Family Food Official website
Miguel Maestre's Profile

Spanish chefs
Spanish writers
Spanish television chefs
Spanish emigrants to Australia
Spanish expatriates in Scotland
Australian people of Spanish descent
Australian television chefs
Australian restaurateurs
1979 births
Living people
I'm a Celebrity...Get Me Out of Here! (Australian TV series) participants
I'm a Celebrity...Get Me Out of Here! (Australian TV series) winners